Knopf (also spelt Knopff) is a German surname meaning "button", and may refer to:

 Alfred A. Knopf (1892–1984), American publisher
 Edwin H. Knopf (1899–1981), American film producer, director and screenwriter
 Heinrich Knopf (1839–1875), German luthier
 Jim Knopf, computer specialist
 Maike-Katrin Knopf (born 1959), German footballer
 Philip Knopf (1847–1920), member of the United States House of Representatives from Illinois
 Rainer Knopff, Canadian political scientist
 Sigard Adolphus Knopf (1857–1940), German-American physician

See also
Fernand Khnopff, Belgian artist

Surnames